HD 128311 b is an exoplanet located approximately 54 light-years away in the constellation of Boötes. This planet orbits in an eccentric orbit about 1.084 AU from its star (HD 128311). The planet has a minimum mass of 1.769 Jupiter masses.

References

External links
 
 

Boötes
Giant planets
Exoplanets discovered in 2002
Exoplanets detected by radial velocity